The 2022 Baptist Health 200 was the 22nd stock car race of the 2022 NASCAR Camping World Truck Series, the final race of the Round of 8, and the 26th iteration of the event. The race was held on Saturday, October 22, 2022, in Homestead, Florida at Homestead–Miami Speedway, a  permanent oval-shaped racetrack. The race took the scheduled 134 laps to complete. Ty Majeski, driving for ThorSport Racing, would take the lead during the middle of the race, and earned his second career NASCAR Camping World Truck Series win, along with his second of the season. Majeski mainly dominated the race as well, leading 67 laps. To fill out the podium, Zane Smith, driving for Front Row Motorsports, and Stewart Friesen, driving for Halmar Friesen Racing, would finish 2nd and 3rd, respectively.

The four drivers to advance into the championship 4 are Ty Majeski, Zane Smith, Chandler Smith, and Ben Rhodes.

Background 
Homestead–Miami Speedway is a motor racing track located in Homestead, Florida. The track, which has several configurations, has promoted several series of racing, including NASCAR, the IndyCar Series, the WeatherTech SportsCar Championship series, and the Championship Cup Series.

From 2002 to 2019, Homestead–Miami Speedway hosted the final race of the season in all three of NASCAR's series as Ford Championship Weekend: the NASCAR Cup Series, NASCAR Xfinity Series, and the NASCAR Camping World Truck Series. The races currently have the names Dixie Vodka 400, Contender Boats 250, and Baptist Health 200, respectively.

Entry list 

 (R) denotes rookie driver.

Practice 
The only 20-minute practice session was held on Friday, October 21, at 4:00 PM EST.

Qualifying 
Qualifying was scheduled to be held on Friday, October 21, at 4:30 PM EST. Since Homestead–Miami Speedway is an oval track, the qualifying system used is a single-car, one-lap system with only one round. Whoever sets the fastest time in the round wins the pole.
Qualifying was cancelled due to inclement weather. The starting lineup would be determined by a performance-based metric system. As a result, Ryan Preece, driving for David Gilliland Racing, would earn the pole. Clay Greenfield would fail to qualify.

Race results 
Stage 1 Laps: 40

Stage 2 Laps: 40

Stage 3 Laps: 54

Standings after the race 

Drivers' Championship standings

Note: Only the first 10 positions are included for the driver standings.

References 

Baptist Health 200
2022 Baptist Health 200
Baptist Health 200
Baptist Health 200